Janez Strajnar (born 20 April 1971) is a retired Slovenian football goalkeeper.

External links 
 
 PrvaLiga profile 

1971 births
Living people
Footballers from Ljubljana
Slovenian footballers
Association football goalkeepers
NK Domžale players
ND Gorica players
NK Primorje players
NK IB 1975 Ljubljana players
Slovenia international footballers